Kaj Lindström (born 31 July 1969) is a Finnish sporting director, who worked for Toyota Gazoo Racing WRT. Prior to this position, he was a rally co-driver.

References

External links

 Kaj Lindström's e-wrc profile

1969 births
Living people
Finnish rally co-drivers
World Rally Championship co-drivers
People from Mikkeli
Sportspeople from South Savo